"Luv Me Again" is a song by American rapper and singer PnB Rock. It was independently released on September 2, 2022, through his label New Lane Entertainment, with the single serving as his first independent release since 2015. The song was written by PnB Rock, and produced by D.A. Got That Dope.  This was the last song to be released by PnB Rock during his lifetime; he died ten days after its release.

References 

2022 singles
2022 songs
PnB Rock songs
Songs written by D.A. Got That Dope
Songs written by PnB Rock